Viticulture (from the Latin word for vine) or winegrowing (wine growing) is the cultivation and harvesting of grapes. It is a branch of the science of horticulture. While the native territory of Vitis vinifera, the common grape vine, ranges from Western Europe to the Persian shores of the Caspian Sea, the vine has demonstrated high levels of adaptability to new environments, hence viticulture can be found on every continent except Antarctica.

Duties of the viticulturist include monitoring and controlling pests and diseases, fertilizing, irrigation, canopy management, monitoring fruit development and characteristics, deciding when to harvest, and vine pruning during the winter months. Viticulturists are often intimately involved with winemakers, because vineyard management and the resulting grape characteristics provide the basis from which winemaking can begin.
A great number of varieties are now approved in the European Union as true grapes for winegrowing and viticulture.

History
The earliest evidence of grape vine cultivation and winemaking dates back 8,000 years. The history of viticulture is closely related to the history of wine, with evidence that humans cultivated wild grapes to make wine as far back as the Neolithic period. Evidence suggests that some of the earliest domestication of Vitis vinifera occurred in the area of the modern countries Georgia and Armenia. The oldest-known winery was discovered in the "Areni-1" cave in Vayots Dzor, Armenia. Dated to  BC, the site contained a wine press, fermentation vats, jars, and cups. Archaeologists also found V. vinifera seeds and vines. Commenting on the importance of the find, McGovern said, "The fact that winemaking was already so well developed in 4000 BC suggests that the technology probably goes back much earlier." There is also evidence of grape domestication in the Near East in the early Bronze Age, around 3200 BC.

Evidence of ancient viticulture is provided by cuneiform sources (ancient writing on clay tablets), plant remains, historical geography, and archaeological excavations. The remnants of ancient wine jars have been used to determine the culture of wine consumption and cultivated grape species. In addition to winemaking, grapes have been grown for the production of raisins.

The earliest act of cultivation appears to have been the favoring of hermaphroditic members of the Vitis vinifera species over the barren male vines and the female vines, which were dependent on a nearby male for pollination. With the ability to pollinate itself, over time the hermaphroditic vines were able to sire offspring that were consistently hermaphroditic.

At the end of the 5th century BC, the Greek historian Thucydides wrote:

Thucydides was most likely referencing the time between 3000 BC and 2000 BC, when viticulture emerged in force in Asia Minor, Greece, and the Cyclades Islands of the Aegean Sea. During this period, grape cultivation developed from an aspect of local consumption to an important component of international economies and trade.

Roman
From 1200 BC to 900 BC, the Phoenicians developed viticulture practices that were later used in Carthage. Around 500 BC, the Carthaginian writer Mago recorded such practices in a two-volume work that was one of the few artifacts to survive the Roman destruction of Carthage during the Third Punic War. The Roman statesman Cato the Elder was influenced by these texts, and around 160 BC he wrote De Agricultura, which expounded on Roman viticulture and agriculture. Around 65 AD, the Roman writer Columella produced the most detailed work on Roman viticulture in his twelve-volume text De Re Rustica. Columella's work is one of the earliest to detail trellis systems for raising vines off the ground. Columella advocated the use of stakes versus the previously accepted practice of training vines to grow up along tree trunks. The benefits of using stakes over trees was largely to minimize the dangers associated with climbing trees, which was necessary to prune the dense foliage in order to give the vines sunlight, and later to harvest them.

Roman expansion across Western Europe brought Roman viticulture to the areas that would become some of the world's best-known winegrowing regions: the Spanish Rioja, the German Mosel, and the French Bordeaux, Burgundy and Rhône. Roman viticulturists were among the first to identify steep hillsides as one of the better locations to plant vines, because cool air runs downhill and gathers at the bottom of valleys. While some cool air is beneficial, too much can rob the vine of the heat it needs for photosynthesis, and in winter it increases the risk of frost.

Medieval
Catholic monks (particularly the Cistercians) were the most prominent viticulturists of the Middle Ages. Around this time, an early system of Metayage emerged in France with laborers (Prendeur) working the vineyards under contractual agreements with the landowners (Bailleur). In most cases, the prendeurs were given flexibility in selecting their crop and developing their own vineyard practice. In northern Europe, the weather and climate posed difficulties for grape cultivation, so certain species were selected that better suited the environment. Most vineyards grew white varieties of grape, which are more resistant to the damp and cold climates. A few species of red grape, such as the Pinot Noir, were also introduced.

Les Très Riches Heures du duc de Berry dates back to 1416 and depicts horticulture and viticulture in France. The images illustrate peasants bending down to prune grapes from vines behind castle walls. Additional illustrations depict grape vines being harvested, with each vine being cut to three spurs around knee height.

Many of the viticultural practices developed in this time period would become staples of European viticulture until the 18th century. Varietals were studied more intently to see which vines were the most suitable for a particular area. Around this time, an early concept of terroir emerged as wines from particular places began to develop a reputation for uniqueness. The concept of pruning for quality over quantity emerged, mainly through Cistercian labors, though it would create conflict between the rich landowners who wanted higher quality wines and the peasant laborers whose livelihood depended on the quantity of wine they could sell. The Riesling is the famous example for higher quality of wine. In 1435 Count John IV. of Katzenelnbogen started this successful tradition.

In Burgundy, the Cistercian monks developed the concept of cru vineyards as homogeneous pieces of land that consistently produce wines each vintage that are similar. In areas like the Côte-d'Or, the monks divided the land into separate vineyards, many of which still exist today, like Montrachet and La Romanée.

In mythology
In Greek mythology, the demigod Dionysus (Bacchus in Roman mythology), son of Zeus, invented the grapevine and the winepress. When his closest satyr friend died trying to bring him a vine Dionysus deemed important, Dionysus forced the vine to bear fruit. His fame spread, and he finally became a god.

The Bible makes numerous references to wine, and grapevines, both symbolically and literally. Grapes are first mentioned when Noah grows them on his farm (Genesis 9:20–21). References to wine are made in the book of Proverbs (20:1) and the book of Isaiah (5:1–25). Deuteronomy (18:3–5, 14:22–27, 16:13–15) reports the use of wine during Jewish festivals. In Christianity wine is the symbol of the Last Supper, representing the blood of Christ. It is mentioned several times in the New Testament. We have the parable of the kingdom of heaven likened to the father starting to engage laborers for his vineyard. The vine is used as symbol of Jesus Christ based on his own statement, “I am the true vine (John 15:1).” In that sense, a vine is placed as sole symbol on the tomb of Constantine the Great.

The grape vine

The vast majority of the world's wine-producing regions are found between the temperate latitudes of 30° and 50° in each hemisphere. The presence of large bodies of water and mountain ranges can have positive effects on the climate and vines. Nearby lakes and rivers can serve as protection for drastic temperature drops at night by releasing the heat that the water has stored during the day to warm the vines.

The grape

The grape is classified as a berry. On the vine, grapes are organized through systems known as clusters. Grape clusters can vary in compactness which can result in long clusters (resulting in the grapes spreading out) or short clusters (resulting in grapes packed together). In some grape species, clusters ripen collectively, which allows them to be harvested together. For others, grapes may ripen individually within a cluster.
Each grape berry contains a pedicel which attaches to the rachis. The main function of the rachis is to allow the grapes to receive their water and nutrients. The pollination and fertilization of grapes results in one to four seeds within each berry. When fertilization does not occur, seedless grapes are formed, which are sought after for the production of raisins. Regardless of pollination and fertilization, most plants will produce around 100 to 200 grapes.

The skin of the grape accounts for 5 to 20% of the total weight of a grape depending on the variety. When grape skin ripens, it contains the majority of the aromatic substances and tannin. These factors become important in winemaking for methods including color extraction or aroma dissolution. Although the skin contains the majority of the tannin, small percentages can be found throughout the grape and during all of its developmental stages. However, the tannin's most important role is during the grape's ripening stage as its function is to formulate color and body shape.

Growing vines

Although many factors can affect the overall quality of a grape vine, the three most important are climate, slope, and soil, often collectively referred to as the terroir.

Climate

Climate is the most significant external factor in determining a grape's inherent qualities. Each grape variety has a uniquely preferred environment for ideal growing. Because climates vary from region to region, selecting the best strain is an important decision in grape cultivation. Additionally, because climatic factors such as temperature and rain can be unpredictable and uncontrollable, each year will produce unique qualities and yields of grapes. Wine grapes are also especially susceptible to climate change and temperature variation.

In ideal circumstances, the vine will receive most of the rainfall during the winter and spring months: rain at harvesttime can create many hazards, such as fungal diseases and berry splitting. The optimum weather during the growing season is a long, warm summer that allows the grapes the opportunity to ripen fully and to develop a balance between the levels of acids and sugars in the grape.
Hot and sunny climates have a frost-free growing season of 200 days or more. These climates allow grapes to ripen faster with higher sugar levels and lower acidity. Cooler climates have a frost-free growing season of around 150–160 days. Cooler seasons force the grapes to ripen earlier, which produces a fresher and more acidic harvest.

Ideal summer temperatures enable fruits to ripen. Temperature and sunshine are the most important factors in ripening.

Ideal winter temperatures are necessary to allow grape vines to enter their resting phase. If temperatures fall too low, the crops can be injured.

Spring and Fall: Spring and fall are critical seasons for grape development, because the plants are susceptible to frost damage, which can injure the fruiting buds. Wet weather in spring can increase the odds of mildew formation. To prevent mildew, some farms introduce devices such as heaters or large fans in vineyards. However, such solutions can be costly.

Slope
Hillsides and slopes are preferred over flatter terrain: vines growing on a slope can receive a greater intensity of the sun's rays, with sunshine falling on an angle perpendicular to the hillside. In flatter terrain, the intensity of the sunlight is diluted as it spreads out across a wider surface area. Small slopes that are elevated above surrounding ground are the best and safest places for crops, because these small elevations are less prone to frost. Additionally, a slope affords better drainage, obviating the possibility that the vine might sit in overly moist soil. In cooler regions of the northern hemisphere, south-facing slopes receive more hours of sunlight and are preferred; in warmer climes, north-facing slopes are preferred. In the southern hemisphere, these orientations are reversed.

Soil
Quality soil is important to allow plants to have better root systems. The growth and health of a vine can be affected if the soil quality is poor. Different grape species prefer various soil conditions, although there are general quality factors. Favorable soil conditions include: aeration, loose texture, good drainage and moderate fertility. Drainage factors are cited as the most important soil characteristic to affect grape vine growth. When root growth is restricted due to bad soil, vine growth and fruit yields lessen and plant survival rates can dip to only a few years.

Hazards

A viticulturist faces many hazards that can have an adverse effect on the wine produced from the grape or kill the vine itself.

When the vine is flowering, it is very susceptible to strong winds and hail. Cold temperatures during this period can lead to the onset of millerandage, which produces clusters with no seeds and varying sizes. Hot conditions can produce coulure that causes grape clusters to either drop to the ground or not fully develop.
Oidium is a powdery mildew that can attack all green parts of the vine. If left untreated, oidium can be terminal for the plant. It thrives in cooler temperatures and in the shade. Some North American vine species have evolved to show resistance to the mildew (3:37).
Downy mildew (Peronospora) thrives in high temperatures and humidity and produces stains on leaves. It can be treated by spraying plants with copper sulphate. Most American vines are resistant, excluding Vitis vinifera.
Fanleaf virus is spread by nematodes that breed in the vine stem. It can lead to deformity, yellowing of leaves, and smaller crop yields. There is no cure for the plant; the best course of action is to remove infected plants and leave the remaining roots to rot.
Frost
Phylloxera
Plant virus
Pests

Green harvest
A green harvest is the removal of immature grape bunches, typically for the purpose of decreasing yield. The removal of the bunches while they are still green induces the vine to put all its energy into developing the remaining grapes. In theory this results in better ripening and the development of more numerous and mature flavour compounds. In the absence of a green harvest, a healthy, vigorous vine can produce dilute, unripe grapes.

In Europe, many appellations restrict the yield permitted from a given area, so there is even more incentive to perform green harvesting when presented with excess crop. Often, the excess must be sold for a pittance and used for industrial alcohol production rather than wine.

While the concept of thinning or sacrificing part of the grape crop, i.e. green harvesting, with the aim of improving the quality of the remaining grapes, predates modern critics, the practice has increased in recent times in vineyards found in California and areas where the grapes grow easily. (McCoy)

Field blend

A field blend is a wine that is produced from two or more different grape varieties interplanted in the same vineyard. In the days before precise varietal identification, let alone rigorous clonal selection, a vineyard might be planted by taking cuttings from another vineyard and therefore approximately copying its genetic makeup. This meant that one vine could be Zinfandel and the next Carignan. When making wine with little equipment to spare for separate vinification of different varieties, field blends allowed effortless, though inflexible, blending.

Fermentation tanks are now cheap enough that the field blend is an anachronism, and almost all wines are assembled by blending from smaller, individual lots. However, in California some of the oldest (and lowest-yielding) Zinfandel comes from vineyards that are field-blended. Ridge Vineyards owns the Lytton Springs vineyards in Sonoma County, which were planted from 1900 to 1905 in what Ridge calls "a traditional field blend of about seventy percent Zinfandel, twenty percent Petite Sirah, and ten percent Grenache and Carignan."

Gemischter Satz (Mixed set) is a wine term in German equivalent to a field blend, which means that grapes of different varieties are planted, harvested and vinified together. In older times, this was common, but the practice has almost stopped. It is, however, a specialty of Vienna.

Other traditional field blends include Alsace wine, notably edelzwicker and gentil blends, and Douro wine.

See also

Ampelography
Annual growth cycle of grapevines
Diurnal temperature variation
Global warming and wine
List of vineyard soil types
Oenology
Precision viticulture

Notes

References
{{Reflist|30em|refs=
<ref name=Fraga2016>Fraga, H., Garcia de C. A. I., Malheiro, A.C., Santos, J.A., 2016. "Modelling climate change impacts on viticultural yield, phenology and stress conditions in Europe". Global Change Biology": doi:10.1111/gcb.13382.</ref>
}}
39. Goldammer, T. (2015). Grape Growers Handbook: A Guide To Viticulture for Wine Production. 

Further reading

 
 Echikson, Tom. Noble Rot. New York: Norton, 2004.
 McCoy, Elin. The Emperor of Wine. New York: HarperCollins, 2005.
 Abu-Hamdeh, N.H. 2003. "Compaction and subsoiling effects on corn growth and soil bulk density." Soil Society of America Journal. 67:1213–1219.
 Conradie, W.J., J.L. Van Zyl, P.A. Myburgh. 1996. "Effect of soil preparation depth on nutrient leaching and nutrient uptake by young Vitis vinifera L.cv Pinot noir". South African Journal of Enology & Viticulture 17:43–52.
 Dami, I.E., B. Bordelon, D.C. Ferree, M. Brown, M.A. Ellis, R.N. William, and D. Doohan. 2005. "Midwest Grape Production Guide". The Ohio State Univ. Coop. Extension. Service. Bulletin. 919–5.
 Gil, Emilio; Arnó, Jaume; Llorens, Jordi; Sanz, Ricardo; Llop, Jordi; Rosell-Polo, Joan; Gallart, Montserrat; Escolà, Alexandre (2014). "Advanced Technologies for the Improvement of Spray Application Techniques in Spanish Viticulture: An Overview". Sensors, 14 (1): 691–708. ISSN 1424-8220. PMC PMC3926582
 Kurtural, S.K. 2007. "Desired Soil Properties for Vineyard Site Selection". University of Kentucky Cooperative Extension Service. HortFact – 31 – 01.
 Kurtural, S.K. 2007. "Vineyard Design". University of Kentucky Cooperative Extension Service. HortFact – 3103.
 Kurtural, S.K. 2007. "Vineyard Site Selection". University of Kentucky Cooperative Extension Service. HortFact – 31–02.
 Llorens, Jordi; Gil, Emilio; Llop, Jordi; Escolà, Alexandre 2011. "Ultrasonic and LIDAR Sensors for Electronic Canopy Characterization in Vineyards: Advances to Improve Pesticide Application Methods". Sensors. 11 (2), pp. 2177–2194. doi:10.3390/s110202177. ISSN 1424-8220.
 Llorens, Jordi; Gil, Emilio; Llop, Jordi; Queraltó, Meritxell (2011-06-09). "Georeferenced LiDAR 3D Vine Plantation Map Generation". Sensors 11 (6): 6237–6256. ISSN 1424-8220.
 Phin, John. 1862 (still in print). Open Air Grape Culture : A Practical Treatise On the Garden and Vineyard Culture of the Vine, and the Manufacture of Domestic Wine Designed For the Use of Amateurs and Others.
 Schonbeck, M.W. 1998. "Cover Cropping and Green Manuring on Small Farms in New England and New York". Research Report #10, New Alchemy Institute, 237 Hatchville Rd. Falmouth, Mass. 02536.
 Tesic, Dejan, M. Keller, R.J. Hutton. 2007. "Influence of Vineyard Floor Management Practices on Grapevine Vegetative Growth, Yield, and Fruit Composition". American Journal of Enology and Viticulture 58:1:1–11.
 Zabadal, J.T. Anderson, J.A. Vineyard Establishment I – Preplant Decisions. MSU Extension Fruit Bulletins – 26449701. 1999.
 Tesic, Dejan, M. Keller, R.J. Hutton. "Influence of Vineyard Floor Management Practices on Grapevine Vegetative Growth, Yield, and Fruit Composition". American Journal of Enology and Viticulture'' 58:1:1–11. 2007.

External links

AJEV – American Journal of Enology and Viticulture
Grape Pest Management Guidelines (IPM) UC IPM Online Pest
SAFECROP – Proceedings of the 5th International Workshop on Grapevine Downy and Powdery Mildew
Guide to Grape Vines
Viticulture on www.extension.org 

 
Wine terminology
Agriculture